Polish Braille (alfabet Braille'a) is a braille alphabet for writing the Polish language. It is based on international braille conventions, with the following extensions:

That is, for letters of the first and second decade of the braille script (a, c, e, l, n, s), a diacritic is written as dot 6, and any dot 3 is removed (or, equivalently, is moved to position 6)—that is, the base letter is moved to the fourth decade. For letters of the third decade (u, y, z), which already have a dot 6, the derivation is a mirror image. Ó is derived from u, which is how it is pronounced (also, the mirror image of o is already taken). Several of these conventions are used in Lithuanian Braille.

History 
Some form of a Braille alphabet had been adapted to the Polish language by 1957.

Alphabet
The full alphabet is thus:

Print digraphs in z are written as two letters in braille as well:  cz,  rz,  sz.

Punctuation

Paired punctuation

Formatting

External links
  (a detailed account of typesetting Polish Braille)
 
 Braille Translator online (Conversion of typed text on the Braille characters, full of Polish notation.)

References

French-ordered braille alphabets
B